Guidance Solutions, Inc. is a website development company in building eCommerce websites and mobile applications for retailers such as Burlington Coat Factory and Foot Locker. The company was founded in Hawthorne, California in 1993 by Joe Tang, Pillan Thirumalaisamy, and Vijay Kotrappa. The services offered by the site include eCommerce development elements such as site definition, development as well as mobile and social websites and apps.

In February 2008 the company was purchased by its employees and is currently owned by CEO Jason Meugniot and CIO Jon Provisor. Between March 2007 and January 2008 the company underwent a series of changes in order to operate as an environmentally aware and carbon-neutral company.

References and footnotes

External links

Software companies based in California
Companies based in Los Angeles County, California
Software companies established in 1993
1993 establishments in California
Software companies of the United States